Earle Wilton Richardson, (1912–1935) was an African-American artist made famous mainly for an oil painting of his dating from 1934 titled Employment of Negroes in Agriculture.

This now iconic picture (size 48 × 32 inches) depicts two male and two female Black cotton workers, one of them a child, in an unidentified Southern state loading cotton into bales. Like many other artworks at the time, the painting was commissioned and financed under the New Deal. Richardson committed suicide the following year. He was born and lived in New York City, NY.

"Richardson and fellow artist Malvin Gray Johnson planned to say more about the history and promise of black people in their mural series Negro Achievement, slated to be installed in the New York Public Library’s 135th Street Branch, but neither young man lived long enough to complete the project."

"After Johnson's sudden illness and death in November 1934, Richardson continued to work on their mural project. But within a year he too was dead; ill with fever and heart-broken over the death of Johnson, who had been his lover, Richardson leapt from his fourth-floor apartment window and died of his injuries in December 1935."

Works
 Profile of a Negro Girl, 1932
 Benjamin Banneker, 1934
 Columbus Soldiers—Estavanico, 1934
 Employment of Negroes in Agriculture, 1934

Bibliography
 Alejandro Anreus, Diana L. Linden, Jonathan Weinberg (Editors), The Social and the Real: Political Art of the 1930s in the Western Hemisphere, Penn State Press, 2005,

References

1912 births
1935 suicides
American male painters
Public Works of Art Project artists
20th-century American painters
20th-century American male artists
Painters who committed suicide
Painters from New York City
National Academy of Design alumni
Suicides by jumping in New York City
1935 deaths
20th-century African-American painters
American LGBT artists
LGBT people from New York (state)
LGBT African Americans